Rhizomucor is a genus of fungi in the family Lichtheimiaceae. The widespread genus contains six species. Rhizomucor parasiticus, the species originally selected as the type, is now considered synonymous with Rhizomucor pusillus.

References

Fungi
Fungus genera
Taxa described in 1900